Marshall County High School is a high school in Lewisburg, Tennessee, and a part of Marshall County Schools.

References

External links
 Marshall County High School

Public high schools in Tennessee
Education in Marshall County, Tennessee